Rico Rossi is a Bay Area hip hop recording artist and entrepreneur from Vallejo, California. In 2012, he released his debut single "Take Em Down" featuring Too Short and Baby Bash. He is best known for his single "Too Cold" featuring Idrise and Don Chino, which peaked at number 12 on the German Urban Charts.

Career
In 2011, Rico Rossi was falsely accused and falsely arrested for a crime based on misleading information, which lead to the start of his musician career. He documented this incident through his debut single "Take Everything", which is based on his perspective as the victim.

Beginning of 2016, the Bay Area musician Rico Rossi started his own business venture, called Leangria. The product Leangria, is a cannabis infused fruit syrup concentrate, exclusively sold in the States that have legal recreational or medicinal marijuana. Using the "Leangria" moniker, Rico Rossi established his own clothing line combining his business venture with his music career.

In 2018 the comedy movie "Don't Get Caught" starring Snoop Dogg and E-40 was premiered, where Rico Rossi played the character "Lewis the Gangster". In August 2018, Rico Rossi's product Leangria won the first place at the High Times Cannabis Cup and was crowned as Alaska's best edible cannabis.

Discography

Singles

As lead artist

As featured artist

Promotional singles

References

External links
 
 
 

African-American male rappers
Living people
Rappers from California
Puerto Rican male musicians
21st-century American rappers
21st-century American male musicians
Year of birth missing (living people)
21st-century African-American musicians